Andrew Linighan (born 18 June 1962) is an English former professional footballer who played as a defender from 1980 until 2000, notably in the Premier League for Arsenal and Crystal Palace.

He also played in the Football League for Hartlepool United, Leeds United, Oldham Athletic, Norwich City, Queens Park Rangers and Oxford United before finishing his career with Non-league St Albans City.

Career
Linighan was born in Hartlepool into a footballing family as his brothers David and Brian were also professional footballers. He first played for his local side, Hartlepool United, before he signed for Leeds United in 1984. He spent two season at Elland Road, being part of the team which narrowly missed out on promotion to the First Division in his first season there and then signed for Oldham Athletic.

In March 1988, a 25-year-old Linighan finally arrived on the First Division scene when Oldham sold him to Norwich City for £350,000. A tall, imposing centre back, Linighan became notable for his calm performances in defence for Norwich, who finished fourth in the league and reached the FA Cup semi finals in his first full season with them.

He was then signed by George Graham for Arsenal in a £1.2million deal in July 1990. Linighan had been very reluctant to leave Norwich, but was told by then-chairman Robert Chase that he was being sold.

Linighan mainly played as backup to England international defenders Tony Adams and Steve Bould in his first season, in which Arsenal won the First Division. Linighan managed to put in 10 league appearances, which were enough for him to earn a winners medal. His biggest moment for the club came at the end of the 1992–93 season. Linighan was victorious as he lifted the League Cup as Arsenal beat Sheffield Wednesday 2–1 in the final at Wembley. Arsenal again met Wednesday of whom they faced in the final of the FA Cup. The final finished 1–1, forcing a replay, which finished a goal apiece after 90 minutes and thus went to extra time. With 119 minutes gone, Linighan, who was suffering from a broken nose after Mark Bright had struck him in the face with his elbow, came up for a corner and headed in the winner. Coincidentally it was Bright who Linighan outjumped to score. Thanks to his goal, Arsenal became the first club in English football to win the Cup Double. His former club, Norwich City, qualified for the UEFA Cup as a result of his FA Cup final winning goal, as it meant the European place for the League Cup winner went to the team who had finished third in the Premier League instead.

By then, Linighan's place in the Arsenal side was further in doubt, as Martin Keown was no longer cup-tied after signing for the club earlier that year. Despite this, he stayed on at the club as fourth-choice centre-back. A highlight in his later years at Arsenal was scoring a late equaliser in a 2–2 draw away at Aston Villa in September 1996.

After more than six years at Highbury, he was sold to Division One promotion chasers Crystal Palace for £110,000 in January 1997. He helped Palace as they won promotion to the Premiership that year as playoff winners. Linighan also in that year became the captain of the Eagles, but was unable to prevent them from being relegated straight back to Division One. He stuck with Palace during the club's financial problems, even after they were forced to loan him to Queens Park Rangers for the final stages of the 1998–99 season to reduce their wage bill. Linighan returned to the club after his loan spell as captain, and in his 38th year was voted as Crystal Palace's Player of the Year in 1999–2000. After a falling out with new owner Simon Jordan, he was given a free transfer in the autumn of 2000.

Linighan saw out the rest of the season with Oxford United, which ended in disappointment as United were relegated to the Division Three. Afterwards he briefly played for non-league St Albans, before retiring completely from the game.

Personal life
After his playing days came to an end, Linighan became the owner of a plumbing company.

Career statistics

Honours
Arsenal
Football League First Division: 1990–91
FA Charity Shield: 1991 (shared)
FA Cup: 1992–93
Football League Cup: 1992–93
European Cup Winners' Cup: 1993–94
Runner-up: 1994–95

Crystal Palace

Football League First Division play-offs: 1996–97

Individual
Crystal Palace Player of the Year: 1999–2000

References

External links

Career information at ex-canaries.co.uk

1962 births
Living people
Footballers from Hartlepool
Arsenal F.C. players
Crystal Palace F.C. players
English footballers
England B international footballers
Association football central defenders
Hartlepool United F.C. players
Leeds United F.C. players
Norwich City F.C. players
Oldham Athletic A.F.C. players
Oxford United F.C. players
St Albans City F.C. players
Queens Park Rangers F.C. players
Premier League players
People educated at English Martyrs School and Sixth Form College
FA Cup Final players